Nürnberger Land is a Landkreis (district) in Bavaria, Germany. It is bounded by (from the north and clockwise) the districts of Forchheim, Bayreuth, Amberg-Sulzbach, Neumarkt, Roth and Erlangen-Höchstadt, and by the city of Nuremberg.

History

The district was established in 1972 by merging the former districts of Nuremberg, Hersbruck and Lauf, reuniting for the first time since 1789 most of the former lands of the Imperial City of Nuremberg.

Geography

The district includes the eastern metropolitan area of Nuremberg in the west and the hills of the Frankish Alb in the east. The Pegnitz River runs through the district, coming from the northeast and leaving to the west towards Nuremberg.

Coat of arms
The upper part of the coat of arms is identical to the city arms of Nuremberg. In the bottom part there is a water wheel representing the watermills on the river Pegnitz.

Towns and municipalities

References

External links

Official website (German)
Schwaig bei Nürnberg (German)

 
Districts of Bavaria